Kings Park Speedway is an auto racing facility located north-east of Regina and north-west of Pilot Butte, Saskatchewan, Canada, operated by the Regina Auto Racing Club. The facility features a 1/3 mile high-banked paved oval with longer straights and tight turns, paper clip style track. It is primarily used for stock car racing. Originally opened in 1967 as a dirt oval, it was paved in 1970 and re-paved in 2007. In 2010 it hosted events such has Pro Trucks, Baby Grand racing series, Legends of Alberta, Western Canada Super Late Model Racing Series & Evolution Mini Cup Car series, and numerous provincial racing divisions. In 2016 it held regular races in the Street Stock, Bomber and Mini stock classes. 2015 special events included Drifting, trailer racing, and wheelies. In 2017 Kings Park Speedway celebrated its 50th season.

References

External links
 Kings Park Speedway
 Satellite view of Kings Park Speedway on Google Maps

Pilot Butte, Saskatchewan
Motorsport venues in Saskatchewan
Paved oval racing venues in Canada
1960s establishments in Saskatchewan